The Grudge is an album released by Mortiis. It was recorded at Silvertone Studios in Fredrikstad, Norway in 2003-2004 and released in 2004.
The artwork was done by Jean Sebastian Rossbach of the Living Rope Design. The album is more metal leaning and aggressive, whereas the previous release was more melodic.

Track listing
All Songs Written by Mortiis, Levi Gawron, Asmund Sveinunggard & Leo Troy.
"Broken Skin"  – 5:30
"Way Too Wicked"  – 4:37
"The Grudge"  – 5:35
"Decadent & Desperate"  – 3:24
"The Worst in Me"  – 7:09
"Gibber"  – 4:18
"Twist the Knife"  – 4:13
"The Loneliest Thing"  – 4:53
"Le Petit Cochon Sordide"  – 4:33
"Asthma"  – 2:26

The following tracks were released on the German version and on "The Grudge" single:

"The Grudge (Despectus)"  – 4:41
"Decadent & Desperate (Flickin' the Bitch Switch mix)"  – 4:35

Personnel

Mortiis
Mortiis: Vocal, Keyboards, Synthesizers, Programming
Levi Gawron: Guitars
Asmund Sveinunggard: Guitars
Leo Troy: Drums, Percussion

Additional Musicians
Vegard Blomberg: Acoustic Guitars
Endre Tønnesen: Bass on tracks 1, 5, 7, 8 & 10
Magnus Abelsen: Bass on track 9
Joe Gibber, Vegard Blomberg: Keyboards, Programming
Louise Marie Degnzman Pedersen, Stephan Groth: Vocal Backing

Production
Arranged By Mortiis
Produced By Mortiis & Vegard Blomberg
Engineered By Mortiis
Mixed By Mortiis, Levi Gawron, Rune Jorgenson & Vegard Blomberg
Digital Editing: Mortiis, Levi Gawron & Vegard Blomberg
Mastered By Espen Berg

2004 albums
Mortiis albums
Earache Records albums